This list of former synagogues in the United Kingdom consists of buildings in England, Scotland, Wales and Northern Ireland which were previously used as synagogues; for a list of current Jewish communities or congregations, see List of Jewish communities in the United Kingdom.

England

London

 Bayswater Synagogue, Chichester Place, Paddington, demolished in 1965 for construction of the Westway overpass and the Warwick Estate redevelopment
 Brixton Synagogue, Effra Road, Brixton
 Dalston Synagogue, Poets Road, Newington Green (c.1875–1970), demolished in 1970 and replaced by a block of council flats
 Dollis Hill Synagogue, which is now part of the Torah Temimah Primary School
 Fieldgate Street Great Synagogue, East End, which closed in 2014
 Great Synagogue of London, City of London, destroyed in The Blitz during World War II
 Machzike Hadath (Spitalfields Great Synagogue), East End, now the Brick Lane Mosque
 South East London Synagogue, New Cross
 Wlodawa Synagogue, Bethnal Green, which closed in 1987.

Elsewhere

Barnsley, Yorkshire  – Barnsley had a synagogue at 82 Castlereagh Street that was active from 1903 to 1946
 Birmingham – Severn Street Synagogue, now the Athol Masonic Hall
 Blackpool United Hebrew Congregation
Blackburn Hebrew Congregation
 Bolton Synagogue, at 12a Wentworth Street, Bolton, which functioned as Bolton Hebrew Congregation's synagogue from 1924 until 1960, when it was demolished
 Brighton and Hove Regency Synagogue, Devonshire Place; it is now an apartment building
 Brighton and Hove – Roof-top Synagogue, Brunswick Terrace
 Canterbury had a synagogue on King Street. Designed by Hezekiah Marshall and opened in 1848, it was acquired by The King's School in 1982 and is now used for lessons and concerts.
 Cheltenham Synagogue
 Coventry Synagogue, which was built in 1870 and is Grade II listed. 
Derby Hebrew Congregation
 Falmouth, Cornwall – Falmouth Synagogue,
 Guildford Synagogue (medieval)
 Hartlepool – (West) Hartlepool Synagogue – demolished in the 1970s
Hull — Western Synagogue 1903–1994
Knaresborough, North Yorkshire, until 1275
 Lincoln – Jew's Court Synagogue, dating from the 12th century
 Manchester – Spanish and Portuguese Synagogue, now the Manchester Jewish Museum
 Middlesbrough Hebrew Congregation, which closed in 1998
 Newcastle – Jesmond Synagogue, which closed in 1986. The exterior has been carefully conserved, and the interior was gutted and renovated for use as a school.  It formed part of the Newcastle High School for Girls until 2016, when approval was granted for its conversion into flats.
 Newcastle – Leazes Park Synagogue, now used for student accommodation
 Northampton Medieval Synagogue
 Sheffield – Wilson Road Synagogue; the building is now used as a church
 Sunderland Synagogue
 Widnes Synagogue, St Paul's Chambers – closed and became a masonic lodge, later a nightclub. Now derelict.

Scotland
 Dundee Synagogue
 Langside Synagogue, Glasgow

Wales
 Cardiff Old Hebrew Congregation, Cathedral Road, now an office block
 Merthyr Synagogue, Merthyr Tydfil
 Newport Jewish Community and Hebrew Congregation
 Pontypridd Synagogue

Northern Ireland
 Belfast – Regency Street Congregation
 Derry – Londonderry Synagogue
 Lurgan – Lurgan Hebrew Congregation, at 49 North Street, now a dry-cleaning shop

Gallery

See also

List of Jewish communities in the United Kingdom
Oldest synagogues in the United Kingdom

References

External links
 JCR-UK (Jewish Communities & Records – United Kingdom) for a complete list of synagogues (past and present) in the United Kingdom

Lists of religious buildings and structures in the United Kingdom